Norikazu (written: 仁一, 範一, 範和 or 則和) is a masculine Japanese given name. Notable people with the name include:

, Japanese table tennis player
, Japanese footballer
, Japanese television presenter
, Japanese fencer

Japanese masculine given names